The 41st Battalion (French Canadian), CEF, was an infantry battalion of the Canadian Expeditionary Force during the Great War. The 41st Battalion was authorized on 7 November 1914 and embarked for Britain on 18 October 1915. The battalion provided reinforcements to the Canadian Corps in the field until 13 July 1916, when its personnel were absorbed by the 69th Battalion, CEF. The battalion was disbanded on 15 September 1920.

The 41st Battalion recruited in the Province of Quebec and Ottawa, Ontario  and was mobilized at Quebec City.

The 41st Battalion had one Officer Commanding, Lt-Col. L.H. Archambeault 18 October 1915 to 4 April 1916.

The 41st Battalion was awarded the battle honour THE GREAT WAR 1915-16.

The 41st Battalion (French Canadian), CEF, is perpetuated by Le Régiment de Maisonneuve.

References

Sources
Canadian Expeditionary Force 1914-1919 by Col. G.W.L. Nicholson, CD, Queen's Printer, Ottawa, Ontario, 1962

041
Military units and formations of Quebec
Military units and formations of Ontario